Galerucini is a tribe of skeletonizing leaf beetles in the family Chrysomelidae. There are more than 70 genera and at least 480 described species in Galerucini.

Genera
These 76 genera belong to the tribe Galerucini:

 Anadimonia Ogloblin, 1936
 Apophylia Chevrolat, 1836
 Apterogaleruca Chûjô, 1962
 Apteroyinga
 Arima Chapuis, 1875
 Arimetus Jacoby, 1903
 Atysa Baly, 1864
 Austrochorina Bechyné, 1963
 Belarima Reitter, 1913
 Brucita Wilcox, 1965
 Buphonella Jacoby, 1903
 Calaina Schaufuss, 1887
 Caraguata Bechyné, 1954
 Cerochroa Gerstaecker, 1855
 Clitena Baly, 1864
 Clitenella Laboissière, 1927
 Clitenososia Laboissière, 1931
 Coelomera Chevrolat, 1836
 Coraia H. Clark, 1865
 Cydippa Chapuis, 1875
 Derospidea Blake, 1931
 Diorhabda Weise, 1883 (salt cedar beetles)
 Dircema Clark, 1865
 Dircemella Weise, 1902
 Doryxenoides Laboissière, 1927
 Erynephala Blake, 1936
 Eupachytoma Laboissière, 1940
 Galerosastra Laboissière, 1929
 Galeruca Geoffroy, 1762
 Galerucella Crotch, 1873 (water-lily beetles)
 Hallirhotius Jacoby, 1888
 Hemiphracta Weise, 1902
 Hirtigaleruca Chûjô, 1962
 Hoplostines Blackburn, 1890
 Hymenesia Clark, 1865
 Itaitubana Bechyne, 1963
 Iucetima Moura, 1998
 Lochmaea Weise, 1883
 Luperocella Jacoby, 1900
 Mahutia Laboissière, 1918
 Malacotheria Fairmaire, 1881
 Megaleruca Laboissière, 1922 (celtis leaf beetles)
 Menippus Clark, 1864
 Metalepta Baly, 1861
 Metrogaleruca Bechyné & Bechyné, 1969
 Mimastracella Jacoby, 1903
 Miraces Jacoby, 1888 (miraces)
 Monocesta H. Clark, 1865
 Monoxia J. L. LeConte, 1865
 Neolochmaea Laboissière, 1939
 Nestinus Clark, 1865
 Ophraea Jacoby, 1886
 Ophraella Wilcox, 1965
 Pallasiola Jacobson, 1925
 Parapophylia Laboissière, 1922
 Periclitena Weise, 1902
 Platynocera Blanchard, 1846
 Pleronexis Weise, 1908
 Polysastra Shute, 1983
 Poneridia Weise, 1908
 Porphytoma Jacoby, 1903
 Pseudadimonia Duvivier, 1891
 Pseudapophylia Jacoby, 1903
 Pseudosastra
 Pyrrhalta Joannis, 1865
 Rupilia Clark, 1864
 Sastracella Jacoby, 1900
 Schematiza Chevrolat, 1836
 Schematizella Jacoby, 1888
 Syphaxia Baly, 1866
 Taiwanoshaira
 Theone Gistel, 1857
 Tricholochmaea Laboissière, 1932
 Trirhabda J. L. LeConte, 1865
 Xanthogaleruca Laboissière, 1934
 Yingaresca J.Bechyné, 1956

References

Galerucinae